Çardaqlı may refer to:
Çardaqlı, Qubadli, Azerbaijan
Çardaqlı, Shamkir, Azerbaijan
Çardaqlı, Tartar, Azerbaijan

See also
Çardaqlar (disambiguation)